On 4 February 2019, at least 11 people were killed and 10 others injured in a car bombing attack at a shopping mall in Mogadishu, Somalia. The car was parked near the mall 20 minutes before the explosion. The attack happened in Hamar Weyne District, which was very busy at the time. Al-Shabaab claimed responsibility for the attack.

References 

2010s in Mogadishu
2019 in Somalia
2019 murders in Somalia
4 February 2019 bombing
21st-century mass murder in Somalia
4 February 2019 bombing
Attacks on buildings and structures in 2019
4 February 2019 bombing
4 February 2019 bombing
Car and truck bombings in Somalia
February 2019 crimes in Africa
Improvised explosive device bombings in 2019
4 February 2019
Islamic terrorist incidents in 2019
Mass murder in 2019
4 February 2019 bombing
Shopping mall bombings
Terrorist incidents in Somalia in 2019
Somali Civil War (2009–present)